Shoki or Shōki may refer to:
 the Japanese pronunciation of Zhong Kui, a figure in Chinese mythology, traditionally regarded as a vanquisher of ghosts and evil beings
 Nakajima Ki-44 Shōki, a single-engine fighter aircraft used by the Imperial Japanese Army Air Force in World War II
 Nihon Shoki, sometimes translated as The Chronicles of Japan, the second oldest book of classical Japanese history
 Kamen Rider Shōki, a fictional character from Kamen Rider Hibiki

People with the given name
 Shoki Coe, Taiwanese-British theologian
, Japanese footballer 
, Japanese former professional baseball 
Shoki Mokgapa (1984–2018), South African actress
, Japanese footballer 
, Japanese footballer
Shoki Sebotsane (born 1977), South African actress
, Japanese professional sumo wrestler

Japanese masculine given names